Joseph A. Kimball (October 6, 1844 – May 1, 1910) was an American soldier who fought in the American Civil War. Kimball received his country's highest award for bravery during combat, the Medal of Honor. Kimball's medal was won for his capturing the flag of the Confederate 6th North Carolina Infantry at the Battle of Sailor's Creek in Virginia on April 6, 1865. He was honored with the award on May 3, 1865.

Kimball was born in Littleton, New Hampshire, and entered service in Ironton, Ohio. He was buried in Bloomington, Illinois.

Medal of Honor citation
Rank and organization: Private, Company B, 2d West Virginia Cavalry. Place and date: At Sailors Creek, Va., 6 April 1865. Entered service at: Ironton, Ohio. Birth: Littleton, N.H. Date of issue: 3 May 1865.

Kimball's's official Medal of Honor citation reads:

See also
List of American Civil War Medal of Honor recipients: G–L

References

External links

1836 births
1909 deaths
American Civil War recipients of the Medal of Honor
People from Ironton, Ohio
People of Ohio in the American Civil War
Union Army soldiers
United States Army Medal of Honor recipients
Burials in West Virginia